The Women's team sprint took place on 25 February 2009. Team sprint qualifying at 11:00 CET and finals at 13:00 CET. The defending world champions were Finland's Riitta-Liisa Roponen and Virpi Kuitunen. Kuitunen defended her title with Aino-Kaisa Saarinen. The Finns led at every exchange until the last rounds at the finish to win by 20 seconds. This event was Saarinen's third medal at these championships. Anna Olsson earned her first championship medal while Andersson, Longa and Follis earned their second medals at these championships.

Results 
Q – Qualified for final round due to placing in heat
q – Qualified for final round due to times
PF – Placing decided by Photo finish

Semifinals 
Qualification: First 3 in each heat (Q) and the next 6 fastest (q) advance to the final.

Semifinal 1

Semifinal 2

Final

References

External links
Final results
Results - International Ski Federation (FIS)

FIS Nordic World Ski Championships 2009